The Last Enemy is a 1929 play by actor-writer Frank Harvey. It was initially produced by Tom Walls and ran for 12 weeks. Laurence Olivier was in the cast.

It opened on Broadway at the Schubert Theatre on 30 October 1930, with O.B. Clarence from the London cast. The production, directed by Nicholas Hannen, closed after four performances.

It had a run in Sydney in November 1930 and again in 1947.

Plot
Two explorers die in the Antarctic but live on as spiritual guides to their children.

Original London cast
Clara Perry -	Athene Seyler
Cynthia Perry - Marjorie Mars
Dr Alexander Mckenzie - Nicholas Hannen
Harry Graham - Frank Lawton
James Churchill - Carl Harbord
Janitor - Edmund Tottenham
Jerry Warrender - Laurence Olivier
Nancy - Pamela Williams
Thomas Perry - O.B. Clarence
Wilson	- Reginald Kenneth

References

External links
 

English plays
1929 plays
West End plays
Plays by Frank Harvey